Carl Rudolph "Fritz" Poock (February 20, 1877 – January 2, 1945) was an American artist born in Germany. He was a noted practitioner of the Plein-Air Painting style, an important movement in pre-World War II Southern California, and a part of the influential Arroyo Seco art scene.

Early life
Fritz Poock was born in Halberstadt, Germany in 1877.  He studied with Francisco del Marmol of Spain.

Move to Los Angeles
In 1905, Poock moved to Los Angeles, eventually settling in the Highland Park neighborhood. He worked in construction — including a stint at Manzanillo, Mexico, where he also painted  — and as a mechanical drafter until retiring at age 50 to devote himself full-time to painting.

Career
Fritz Poock  worked primarily in watercolor and was a member of the influential California Art Club, painted a mural at Santa Monica High School  and had shows at the venerable Stendahl Galleries  and the Friday Morning Club. Upon his death in 1945, his wife Doris Poock donated paintings to the City of Los Angeles and to the Southwest Museum of the American Indian.

References

1877 births
1945 deaths
19th-century German painters
19th-century American male artists
German male painters
20th-century German painters
20th-century American male artists
19th-century American painters
American male painters
20th-century American painters
People from Halberstadt
Emigrants from the German Empire to the United States